Li Runrun (born 24 February 1983 in Nanjing, Jiangsu, China) is a Chinese long jumper.

He won the bronze medal at the 2007 Asian Championships. He also competed at the 2007 World Championships, the 2008 World Indoor Championships and the 2008 Olympic Games without reaching the final.

His personal best jump is 8.22 metres, achieved in July 2007 in Wuhan.

References
 
 Li Runrun at Sports Reference

1983 births
Living people
Chinese male long jumpers
Athletes (track and field) at the 2008 Summer Olympics
Olympic athletes of China
21st-century Chinese people